Pandarikulam (Vavuniya-03 or official designation 214E), is a suburb of Vavuniya in northern Sri Lanka.

Pandarikulam is one of a number of villages that surrounded Vavuniya which have been annexed by the town as it expanded.

Etymology
The village was previously known as Karunkaliyadithoddam because of the Ebony trees in the area, the village is known to have been given to the citizens of "Pandaram" during the reign of the Vanni kings who used to build garlands and worship at Shaivaite temples. The historical texts of Vavuniya state that Pandarakulam was later renamed as "Pandarikulam" after the hero King Pandaravanniyan.

Location
It is bordered to the north by Kurumankadu, to the east by Vairavarpuliyankula, to the west by Ukkulankulam, and to the south by Pandarikulam South.

History
After the death of King Pandara Vanniyan in 1803, the place fell under the Kingdom of Kandy, until its eventual absorption by the British Empire as a protectorate following the Kandyan Convention of 1815.

Historical Place
Pandarikulam Muthumari Amman Kovil is a Hindu Temple in Pandarikulam. This temple was built in 1522AD. This is the Largest & Biggest Hindu Temple in Vavuniya District.

Education
Vipulanantha College
Maths Centre 
Education Development Institute (EDI)
Lincoln English Academy 
Colombus Best Institute (CBI)

Transport
 Vavuniya Railway Station
 Vavuniya Airport
 Vavuniya Bus Stand

References

Towns in Vavuniya District
Vavuniya DS Division